Lawrence Samuel Storch (January 8, 1923 – July 8, 2022) was an American actor and comedian best known for his comic television roles, including voice-over work for cartoon shows such as Mr. Whoopee on Tennessee Tuxedo and His Tales and his live-action role of the bumbling Corporal Randolph Agarn on F Troop which won a nomination for Emmy Award in 1967.

Early life
Lawrence Samuel Storch was born in New York City, the son of Alfred Storch, a cabdriver and broker and his wife, Sally Kupperman Storch, a telephone operator, jewelry store owner and rooming house operator on January 8, 1923. The Washington Post reported that he was born in The Bronx. The New York Times reported that he was born in Manhattan. The Wall Street Journal reported that he was born on the Upper West Side. His parents were observant Jews. He attended DeWitt Clinton High School in the Bronx with Don Adams, who remained his lifelong friend. Due to hard times in the Great Depression, Storch said he never graduated from high school, instead finding work as a comic for $12 a week opening for bandleader Al Donahue at the band shell in Sheepshead Bay.

During World War II, he served in the United States Navy where he was shipmates with Tony Curtis on the submarine tender .

Career

Performing
Storch was originally a comic. This led to guest appearances on dozens of television series, including, Mannix; Car 54, Where Are You?; Hennesey; Get Smart; Sergeant Bilko; Columbo; CHiPs; Fantasy Island; McCloud; Emergency!; The Flying Nun; Alias Smith and Jones; The Alfred Hitchcock Hour; That Girl; I Dream of Jeannie; Gomer Pyle, U.S.M.C.; Gilligan's Island; The Doris Day Show; The Persuaders; Love, American Style; All in the Family and Kolchak: The Night Stalker.

His most famous role was from 1965 to 1967 as the scheming Corporal Randolph Agarn on the situation comedy F Troop, with Forrest Tucker, Ken Berry and Melody Patterson, for which he was nominated for an Emmy Award in 1967. Other memorable performances from the sixties were Texas Jack in the barroom brawl scene of The Great Race and the eponymous character in the Groovy Guru episode of Get Smart.

In 1975, Storch co-starred with Bob Burns (who wore a gorilla costume) and Forrest Tucker on the short-lived but popular Saturday morning children's show The Ghost Busters. He also appeared on The Love Boat, was Al Bundy's childhood hero on Married... with Children (Al Bundy's daughter Kelly attended an acting school operated by Larry) and was a semi-regular on Car 54, Where Are You?. He co-starred on the short-lived series The Queen and I.

Variety show appearances
Storch appeared on many variety shows, including Sonny and Cher, Laugh-In, Hollywood Squares, Playboy After Dark and The Hollywood Palace, with several appearances on The Ed Sullivan Show, The Tonight Show Starring Johnny Carson and The Steve Allen Show. Jackie Gleason asked Storch to fill in for him in the summer of 1953 while Gleason was on hiatus. This led to the 10-episode The Larry Storch Show with guest stars including Janet Blair, Risë Stevens, Dick Haymes and Cab Calloway.

As an impressionist and voiceover actor
An impressionist, Storch recreated hundreds of voices and dialects ranging from Muhammad Ali to Claude Rains and voiced characters in many television and film animations, including The Pink Panther Show, Groovie Goolies, The Inspector, The Brady Kids, Cool Cat, Koko the Clown, Treasure Island and Tennessee Tuxedo.

Storch worked with Mel Blanc and June Foray at Warner Bros.-Seven Arts, voicing characters such as Merlin the Magic Mouse and Cool Cat. He continued his association with Filmation as a voiceover actor in other series and films the company produced, including Journey Back to Oz (1972) where he voiced Amos, farmhand to Aunt Em and Uncle Henry.

Film appearances
Storch appeared in more than 25 Hollywood films, including Gun Fever (1958), Who Was That Lady? (1960), 40 Pounds of Trouble (1962), Captain Newman, M.D. (1963), Wild and Wonderful (1964), Sex and the Single Girl (1964) and The Great Race (1965). He also appeared in Bus Riley's Back in Town (1965), A Very Special Favor (1965), That Funny Feeling, (1965), The Great Bank Robbery (1969), Airport 1975 (1974), The Happy Hooker Goes to Washington (1977), Record City (1978), S.O.B (1981), Fake-Out (1982), Sweet Sixteen (1983) and A Fine Mess (1986), as well as the cult sci-fi films The Monitors (1969) and Without Warning (1980). Tony Curtis and Storch reunited for a 2003 run of the musical version of Some Like It Hot. In 2005, he worked with Anthony Michael Hall in Funny Valentine (2005) and appeared in the documentary feature The Aristocrats (2005).

Stage work
After success in television and films, Storch returned to the New York stage, having first performed on the Broadway stage in the 1950s. He received rave reviews for the Off-Broadway production of Breaking Legs. Co-starring Philip Bosco and Vincent Gardenia, the show extended several times before going on the road. Storch appeared in the Broadway productions of Porgy and Bess (which Storch considered his favorite), Arsenic and Old Lace with Jean Stapleton and Annie Get Your Gun with Reba McEntire. He toured the United States and Europe with Porgy and Bess.

In 2004, he was in Sly Fox with Richard Dreyfuss and his old friend Irwin Corey. Larry, then 81 and "Professor" Corey, 90, did eight shows a week. In March 2008, Storch celebrated his 50th anniversary performing on Broadway. His first Broadway appearance had been Who Was That Lady I Saw You With, later made into a 1960 film starring Dean Martin and Tony Curtis, with Storch appearing.

Storch and Dark Shadows star Marie Wallace appeared in Love Letters by A. R. Gurney on June 24, 2012, a benefit performance for the Actor's Temple in New York City.

In the summer of 2012, Storch appeared in a benefit performance of Love Letters with actress Diana Sowle (best known for her role as Mrs. Bucket in the original Willy Wonka film) in Farmville, Virginia to benefit The Tom Mix Rangers.

Comedy LPs
Storch recorded a comedy LP, Larry Storch at The Bon Soir, released by Jubilee Records in the 1960s. His other records include Larry Storch Reads Philip Roth's Epstein and singles such as "Pooped" b/w "The Eighth Wonder Of The World" and "I'm Walkin'".

A month before he died, Storch recorded the blues song "Wine Spo-Dee O-Dee" with Mike Clark and his trio. The song was posthumously released soon after Storch’s passing.

Personal life
Storch married actress Norma Catherine Greve on July 10, 1961. They remained married until her death at age 81 on August 28, 2003. Both briefly appeared in the made-for-television movie The Woman Hunter (1972). He had three children: a stepson, Lary May; a daughter, Candace Herman, the result of a brief encounter with his future wife, born in 1947 and given up for adoption (and later reunited); and a stepdaughter, June Cross, born in 1954 to Norma and Jimmy Cross ("Stump" of the song-and-dance team Stump and Stumpy).

Storch's younger brother, Jay (1924–1987), was an actor/voiceover performer under the name Jay Lawrence.

Death
Larry Storch died at his home on the Upper West Side of Manhattan on July 8, 2022, at the age of 99. Associated Press reported that he died from natural causes. The Washington Post reported that he died from complications of Alzheimer’s disease.

Honors and tributes

Storch was nominated for a Primetime Emmy Award in 1967 for Outstanding Continued Performance by an Actor in a Leading Role in a Comedy Series for F Troop. Storch lost to childhood friend Don Adams that year. Storch said he later remarked to Adams, “You kept it on the block.”

An episode of Animaniacs titled "The Sound of Warners" features a banner that says "Larry Storch Days; Nov 13 & 14".

In Fort Lee, New Jersey, Mayor Mark Sokolich named Storch as honorary Mayor for a Day on June 1, 2014. Storch had previously been honored by the local film commission for performing at the Riviera nightclub, which had closed 60 years earlier.
He received the 2013 Barrymore Award for Lifetime Achievement in Film and TV from the Fort Lee Film Commission.

A Golden Palm Star on the Palm Springs, California, Walk of Stars was dedicated to Storch in 2014.

Storch was named an honorary citizen of Passaic, New Jersey, on September 13, 2016. He also received a Navy Distinguished Service Medal to recognise his World War II service.

On January 14, 2019, The Lambs honored Storch with their Shepherd's Award.

Wild West City, an amusement park in New Jersey, renamed one of its storefronts “Larry Storch’s Silver Dollar Saloon” in his honor.

Storch was named an Honorary Friar in early 2019 at a ceremony with Dick Cavett at the New York Friars Club.

On his 97th birthday, Storch was presented with a Proclamation from the State of New York.

Filmography
{| class="wikitable" style="font-size: 90%;"
! style="background: LightSteelBlue;" | Year
! style="background: LightSteelBlue;" | Title
! style="background: LightSteelBlue;" | Role
! style="background: LightSteelBlue;" | Notes
|-
|1951|| The Prince Who Was a Thief || ||
|-
|1958|| Gun Fever || Amigo ||
|-
|1959|| The Last Blitzkrieg || Ennis ||
|-
|1960|| Who Was That Lady? || Orenov ||
|-
|1962|| 40 Pounds of Trouble || Floyd ||
|-
|1963|| Captain Newman, M.D. || Cpl. Gavoni ||
|-
|1964|| Wild and Wonderful || Rufus Gibbs ||
|-
|1964|| Sex and the Single Girl || Motorcycle Cop ||
|-
|1965|| Bus Riley's Back in Town || Howie ||
|-
|1965|| Pink Panther || Narrator / Talking Weight Machine / Man ||
|-
|1965|| The Great Race || Texas Jack ||
|-
|1965|| A Very Special Favor || Harry the Taxi Driver ||
|-
|1965|| That Funny Feeling || Luther ||
|-
|1965-1966|| The Inspector || The Commissioner / Surgeon || Two shorts
|-
|1968|| Mannix: Another Final Exit || Bernie Farmer ||
|-
|1968|| That Girl || John McKenzie ||
|-
|1968|| The Wild Bull Returns || Manuel Cortez ||
|-
|1969|| Get Smart  “The Groovy Guru” || Groovy Guru ||
|-
|1969|| The Great Bank Robbery || Juan ||
|-
|1969|| The Monitors || P.A. Stutz ||
|-
|1970|| Hard Frame || Rudy LeRoy ||  TV movie
|-
|1971|| Aesop's Fables || Hare, Rooster and Old Tortoise || Voice, TV movie
|-
|1972|| Journey Back to Oz || Amos || Voice
|-
|1973|| Treasure Island || Captain Smollett || Voice
|-
|1974|| Oliver Twist || Magistrate Fang || Voice
|-
|1974|| Airport 1975 || Glenn Purcell ||
|-
|1977|| The Happy Hooker Goes to Washington || Robby Boggs ||
|-
|1978|| Record City || Deaf Man ||
|-
|1980|| Without Warning || Scoutmaster ||
|-
|1981|| S.O.B. || The Guru ||
|-
|1981|| Peter-No-Tail || Max || Voice, English version
|-
|1982|| Fake-Out || Ted ||
|-
|1982|| The Flight of Dragons || Pawnbroker|| Voice
|-
|1983|| Sweet Sixteen || Earl ||
|-
|1986|| The Perils of P.K. || ||
|-
|1986|| A Fine Mess || Leopold Klop ||
|-
|1987|| Medium Rare || ||
|-
|1992|| I Don't Buy Kisses Anymore || Giora ||
|-
|1994|| The Silence of the Hams || Sergeant ||
|-
|1995|| Married... with Children || Himself || Episode: Something Larry This Way Comes (S9, E21)
|-
|2005|| Funny Valentine || Dennis ||
|-
|2005|| Bittersweet Place || Ira Tatz ||
|-
|2005|| The Aristocrats || Himself|| Final Role
|-
|TBA|| One of Our Monsters and Robots Are Missing|| Don Grundy (voice)|| Final animated film role
|-
|}

References

Further reading
Articles
 Leslie (November 11, 1942). "House Reviews: Olympia, Miami". Variety. p. 47
 Huts. (January 16, 1946). "Night Club Reviews: Ciro's, Hollywood". Variety. p. 54
 Mildred Martin (April 20, 1946). "Benny Goodman at Earle". The Philadelphia Inquirer. p. 16
 Elie. (May 8, 1946). "House Reviews: RKO, Boston". Variety. p. 62
 Stal. (July 9, 1952). "Television Reviews: Cavalcade of Stars". Variety. p. 30
 Karr, John (April 2, 1987). "Jim and Judy, Judy and Larry". Bay Area Reporter''. pp. 29, 31

Books
 Smith, Ronald L. (1993). Comic Support: Second Bananas in the Movies.  Secaucus, N.J.: Carol Publishing Group. pp. 221–222. .

External links

 
 
 
 
 Official Larry Storch MySpace page
 

1923 births
2022 deaths
American impressionists (entertainers)
American male comedians
American male film actors
American male television actors
American male voice actors
American stand-up comedians
Apex Records artists
Comedians from California
Comedians from New York City
DeWitt Clinton High School alumni
Filmation people
Jewish American male actors
Jewish American male comedians
Jubilee Records artists
Male actors from Los Angeles
Male actors from New York City
MGM Records artists
Military personnel from New York City
People from the Upper West Side
United States Navy personnel of World War II
United States Navy sailors
20th-century American comedians
21st-century American comedians
20th-century American male actors
21st-century American male actors